In geometric topology,  the double suspension theorem of James W. Cannon and Robert D. Edwards states that the double suspension S2X of a homology sphere X is a topological sphere.

If X is a piecewise-linear homology sphere but not a sphere, then its double suspension S2X (with a triangulation derived by applying the double suspension operation to a triangulation of X) is an example of a triangulation of a topological sphere that is not piecewise-linear. The reason is that, unlike in piecewise-linear manifolds, the link of one of the suspension points is not a sphere.

See also

References

 Steve Ferry, Geometric Topology Notes (See Chapter 26, page 166)

Geometric topology
Theorems in topology